Live is a live EP by the Smithereens, released in 1988 by Restless Records. It was the first release in the Restless Performance Series, which was initiated in January 1988, releasing CD-only live recordings. The EP contains six songs from a show recorded in October 1986 for MTV's "Live from The Ritz" concert series.

The EP was reissued for digital download in September 2011 as New York City 1986 with the same track listing.

Critical reception
Trouser Press wrote that "the six selections (a perfect cover of the Who’s "The Seeker" joins the group’s own tunes) [are] flawless, the performance crisp and exciting." AllMusic felt that the EP "preserves the band in top form, with Pat DiNizio's vocals boasting a tougher edge than he displays in the studio and Jim Babjak's guitar gaining some additional on-stage crunch." They commented that the EP is likely to be appreciated by fans only, but also shows why the Smithereens were "a potent live attraction."

Track listing

Personnel
The Smithereens
Pat DiNizio – vocals, guitar
Jim Babjak – guitar, vocals
Dennis Diken – drums, vocals
Mike Mesaros – bass, vocals
Technical
Susan Myers – front cover photography 
Dennis Diken – liner notes (November 1987)

References

External links 
 Live on Discogs.com. Retrieved on 11 February 2018.

The Smithereens albums
1988 EPs
Live EPs